Monzeglio is an Italian surname. Notable people with the surname include:

 Eraldo Monzeglio (1906 – 1981), Italian association football coach and player
 Manuel Monzeglio (born 2001), Uruguayan professional footballer 

Italian-language surnames